The 1895 Cork Senior Football Championship was the ninth staging of the Cork Senior Football Championship since its establishment by the Cork County Board in 1887.

Nils were the defending champions.

Fermoy won the championship following a 0-06 to 0-01 defeat of Nils in the final at Cork Park. This was their first ever championship title.

Results

Final

Statistics

Miscellaneous
 Fermoy win the championship for the first time.

References

Cork Senior Football Championship